Insurgent Army may refer to:
 Revolutionary Insurgent Army of Ukraine (1918–1921)
 Ukrainian People's Revolutionary Army (1941–1944)
 Ukrainian Insurgent Army (1942–1956)
 People's Liberation Insurgent Army (1943–1944)
 Russian Insurgent Army (2014–present)